WLRS (1570 AM, "La Poderosa") is a radio station broadcasting a Spanish music format. Licensed to New Albany, Indiana, United States. Currently owned by New Albany Broadcasting Co., Inc.

This station is where former NPR news host and current Sirius XM/PRI talk host Bob Edwards began his broadcast career in 1968.

On September 26, 2011, WNDA changed their format to news/talk, branded as "NewsTalk 1570".

On May 25, 2015, WNDA changed their format to Spanish, branded as "La Poderosa" ("The Powerful One" in Spanish).

On June 3, 2016, WNDA changed their call letters to WLRS.

Previous logo

References

External links

 
 

LRS
LRS (AM)
Radio stations established in 1949